Çandahar (also, Çandaxar, Chandakhar, and Ğəndahar) is a village and municipality in the Ismailli Rayon of Azerbaijan.  It has a population of 155.  The municipality consists of the villages of Çandahar and Zarat.

References 

Populated places in Ismayilli District